Arthur Challinor Asbury  (born March 24, 1922 in Dwight, Ontario; died November 13, 2003 in Bobcaygeon, Ontario) is a Canadian hydroplane boat racer. He was inducted into the Canadian Motorsport Hall of Fame in 2001

World record
On November 1, 1957, Asbury broke the world water speed record by driving the Miss Supertest II 184.54 miles per hour on Long Reach, Picton, Ontario.

References

Canadian motorboat racers
2003 deaths
1922 births
Sportspeople from Kawartha Lakes